Jose Antonio Vargas (born June 18, 1984) is an American media commentator and YouTuber. He is notable for his portrayal of the character AngryJoe and for his production of the AngryJoeShow, a video game and movie review channel.

YouTube
Vargas launched his YouTube channel AngryJoeShow on October 4, 2008 with the video "Shit that Pisses Me Off - Madden 2009 Hardcore Gamers". The show features Vargas's character "AngryJoe" reviewing a video game with a scale from 1-10. These reviews typically use sketch comedy and clips from his streams on Twitch. The channel was well received by the YouTube community; as of April 2021, the channel has accrued over one billion views and has amassed more than 3,200,000 subscribers. In addition to game reviews, Vargas produces movie reviews on his channel. Vargas and his channel have received mention in media covering YouTube, most notably for Vargas's opposition to copyright overreach on YouTube. Vargas's interest in copyright on YouTube stemmed from an incident in which Nintendo of America filed a copyright claim on a video of Joe playing Mario Party 10.

Vargas was affiliated with Blistered Thumbs of the media production company Channel Awesome until April 2018. His departure was due to the then-ongoing controversy regarding Channel Awesome and many of its former producers, many of whom Vargas had previously known and affiliated with in the past.

Street Fighter: The Miniatures Game 
In April 2018, a Kickstarter project to create a board game featuring miniature-sized figures of licensed characters from the Street Fighter series of video games (in collaboration with Jasco Games) was launched by Vargas. The project's Kickstarter campaign raised $400,000 on its first day, an event which in turn attracted media coverage.

In January 2021, Street Fighter: The Miniatures Game began shipping to those that backed the Kickstarter project.

Vargas worked in another collaboration with Jasco Games on Mortal Kombat: The Miniatures Game based of the license of the same name.

Awards and nominations

References

External links 

Video game commentators
Video game critics
American male video game actors
American people of Puerto Rican descent
Gaming YouTubers
Let's Players
Living people
Channel Awesome
People from Austin, Texas
1984 births
YouTubers from Texas
American film critics
YouTube critics and reviewers
Commentary YouTubers
Comedy YouTubers
YouTube channels launched in 2008
English-language YouTube channels